Overland Footwear Group is a New Zealand and Australian footwear and fashion retail company. It operates the Merchant 1948 and Mi Piaci retail chains in both countries and produces its own footwear lines.

Brands

Merchant 1948

The company's flagship Merchant 1948 chain, established in 2012, sells women's and men's shoes.

It has 33 stores in New Zealand, including 11 in Auckland. It also has four stores in Australia, all in greater Melbourne.

Mi Piaci

The Mi Piaci chain, established in 2007, sells women's shoes and accessories. It was founded and continues to be run by Louise Anselmi, the wife of the company's managing director Shane Anselmi.

It has 30 stores around New Zealand, including 11 in Auckland. It also has an online shop in Australia.

Deuce

The company's Deuce sneaker brand is available through its other retail stores.

It also had its own dedicated concept store for a period from 2017.

Merchant Repair

Merchant 1948 opened an in-store repair workshop called Merchant Repair in its store in Melbourne's Chadstone Shopping Centre in 2017.

It added a similar Merchant Repair workshop to its Auckland flagship store in Westfield Newmarket in 2000.

History

Kings Country Shoes era

North Italian immigrant Guglielmo (William) Anselmi purchased three shoe stores in the King Country, known as King Country Shoes, in 1948.

Under the management of Guglielmo's son Tony, the chain opened new stores and a factory in Te Kuiti.

Shane's Shoetown era

Tony Anselmi opened a discount shoe store in Lynn Mall, New Zealand's first shopping mall, when it opened in 1963. He named it Shane's Shoetown, after his son, because an advisor told him it would make it sound more personal.

He later added stores in Karangahape Road, Otara and St Lukes Shopping Centre. It became New Zealand's largest discount shoe retailer.

Overland era

Tony's son Shane developed the concept for a company's third brand, the premium chain Overland, after returning to the company following the 1987 sharemarket crash. Its first store in Auckland's Newmarket 277 opened in 1990, featuring dark timber veneer, copper highlights, and an old grand piano to display shoes on. The name Overland came from a magazine article about fashion and the outdoors.

A second store was opened in the St Lukes Shopping Centre. During the 1990s, the company continued opening more Overland stores while closing its discount Shoetown stores. The first Christchurch Overland store opened in 1997.

The Mi Piaci brand was launched in 2002. The Deuce sneaker brand was launched in 2007.

In 2012, the company opened its first Merchant 2018 store and its first store in Australia.

By 2014, the company had 60 high-street stores branded as Overland, Merchant 1948 and Mi Piaci. It was designing 40% of its shoes in-house, with designers recruited from Nike or Adidas or as new graduates from the London College of Fashion.

Merhcant 1948 era

In 2015, Merchant 1948 replaced Overland as the company's flagship brand. The company launched a new online shopping website, opened a new store in the NorthWest Shopping Centre, and began expanding in Australia.

In 2017, the company had 57 stores in New Zealand and Australia, including 13 under the Mi Piaci brand. These included 13 Mi Piaci stores. Overland stores were gradually being rebranded as Merchant 1948.

A concept store for the Deuce sneaker brand briefly operated in Newmarket, Auckland from 2017.

In early 2018, the company won an award for New Zealand's best workplace. At the time it had 450 store across New Zealand and Australia.

In 2018, a member of the Anselmi family, Oscar Anselmi, established his own shoe brand Collective Canvas.

In April 2019, a new store opened in Tauranga in 2019 as part of the second stage of the Tauranga Crossing shopping centre. In October 2019, a new Merchant 1948 flagship store opened in Auckland as part of the new Westfield Newmarket shopping mall.

In January 2020, a car crashed through the front window of the Merchant 1948 store in Taupō.  Three people were injured, including a woman who was pinned against shelving.

In 2021, rival shoe retail company Hannahs was reported to be closing its Hannahs and Number One Shoes stores, in part due to rising competition from Merchant 1948 and Mi Piaci.

A Merchant 1948 store was due to open in Invercargill Central Mall in late 2022.

References

External links
Overland Footwear Group Official Website
Merchant 1948 New Zealand Official Website
Merchant 1948 Australia Official Website
Mi Piaci New Zealand Official Website
Mi Piaci Australia Official Website

Companies based in Auckland
Clothing retailers of Australia
Clothing retailers of New Zealand
Retail companies established in 1948
New Zealand companies established in 1948